Whitehouse Station, also spelled White House Station, is an unincorporated community and census-designated place (CDP) located within Readington Township, in Hunterdon County, New Jersey. At the 2010 United States Census, the CDP's population was 2,089.  Whitehouse Station takes its name from Whitehouse and Abraham Van Horne's 18th century tavern.

New Jersey Transit offers service on the Raritan Valley Line at White House Station.

History
The area, which is now served only by New Jersey Transit's Raritan Valley Line, used to be a railroad junction, serving as the endpoint of the ill-fated Rockaway Valley Railroad, which ceased operation in 1913.
Whitehouse Station was home to the global headquarters of pharmaceutical giant Merck, which was housed in the modernist Merck Headquarters Building. Merck has now shifted its base of operations to Kenilworth.

Geography
According to the United States Census Bureau, the CDP had a total area of 1.346 square miles (3.487 km2), including 1.303 square miles (3.376 km2) of land and 0.043 square miles (0.111 km2) of water (3.20%).

Demographics

Census 2010

Census 2000
At the 2000 United States Census there were 1,951 people, 878 households and 531 families living in the CDP. The population density was 583.9/km2 (1,515.2/mi2). There were 905 housing units at an average density of 270.9/km2 (702.8/mi2). The racial makeup of the CDP was 96.05% White, 0.87% African American, 0.97% Asian, 0.56% from other races, and 1.54% from two or more races. Hispanic or Latino of any race were 2.56% of the population.

There were 878 households, of which 24.9% had children under the age of 18 living with them, 47.4% were married couples living together, 10.4% had a female householder with no husband present, and 39.5% were non-families. 34.1% of all households were made up of individuals, and 11.3% had someone living alone who was 65 years of age or older. The average household size was 2.22 and the average family size was 2.86.

Age distribution was 19.9% under the age of 18, 5.1% from 18 to 24, 33.5% from 25 to 44, 26.4% from 45 to 64, and 15.1% who were 65 years of age or older. The median age was 40 years. For every 100 females there were 87.4 males. For every 100 females age 18 and over, there were 79.7 males.

The median household income was $75,111, and the median family income was $92,793. Males had a median income of $60,673 versus $43,438 for females. The per capita income for the CDP was $38,627. None of the families and 1.4% of the population were living below the poverty line, including no under eighteens and 2.9% of those over 64.

Points of interest
There are several nearby points of interest.

 The Rockaway Reformed Church is the third building of the congregation founded in Whitehouse.

 Memorial Park Cemetery in Whitehouse is near the site of Abraham Van Horne's "White House" tavern. It is maintained by the local chapter of the Daughters of the American Revolution.

 The Whitehouse–Mechanicsville Historic District was added to the National Register of Historic Places in 2015 for its significance in architecture and community development.

Notable people

People who were born in, residents of, or otherwise closely associated with Whitehouse Station include:
 Taissa Farmiga (born 1994), actress.
 Robyn Kenney (born 1979), field hockey player.
 Tom Malloy (born 1974), actor and filmmaker.
 Ed Martin, politician who served as Chair of the Missouri Republican Party.
 James N. Pidcock (1836-1899), represented  in the United States House of Representatives from 1885 to 1889.

References

External links
 
 

Census-designated places in Hunterdon County, New Jersey
Unincorporated communities in Readington Township, New Jersey